Children of the Corn may refer to:

 "Children of the Corn", the short story
 Children of the Corn (film series), film series began with Children of the Corn, released in 1984
 Children of the Corn (1984 film), the 1984 film derived from the aforementioned story
Children of the Corn II: The Final Sacrifice 
Children of the Corn III: Urban Harvest
Children of the Corn IV: The Gathering
 Children of the Corn (2009 film), 2009 made-for-television remake of the 1984 film
 Children of the Corn (2020 film), a 2020 prequel to the 1984 film
 Children of the Corn (group), the hip-hop group
 Children of the Corn (album), an album by Sopor Aeternus
 "Children of the Korn" - A song by Korn from their 1998 album Follow the Leader